Cerro El Baúl, also known as El Baúl, is a forested lava dome overlooking the valley of Quetzaltenango. It is located about 3 km north of the Almolonga volcano, at the south-eastern edge of the city of Quetzaltenango in Guatemala. And is one of the city's last remaining green areas.

Cerro El Baúl covers an area of 2.40 km2 and was declared a national park in 1955. The park is under serious threat due to illicit extraction of trees and advancing urbanization crossing the park borders.

References

National parks of Guatemala
Protected areas established in 1955
Baul
1955 establishments in Guatemala